Death in Freeport is a 2000 role-playing game adventure published by Green Ronin Publishing.

Contents
Death in Freeport is the first in the Freeport series of adventures.

Publication history
Three different companies started d20 System publishing off by releasing their own adventures on August 10, 2000: The Wizard's Amulet (2000) from Necromancer Games, said to be the first d20 product as it was published as a PDF a few minutes into August 10 and was the first widely released d20 supplement); Three Days to Kill (2000) from Atlas Games which technically beat out Amulet because it was available locally a week early but went on sale officially that year at Gen Con which earned it the title of the first print d20 book; and Death in Freeport (2000) trailed Three Days by a few hours but also went on sale at Gen Con on August 10.

Death in Freeport was Green Ronin's lead d20 offering, and went on sale on the same day as the new 3E Player's Handbook (2000) for Dungeons & Dragons, and according to Shannon Appelcline commenting on the first three d20 system adventures, "Of the three adventures, Death in Freeport may be the most notable. It defined a new campaign setting, the city of Freeport, and was also the first in a connected trilogy of d20 adventures. Death in Freeport was also a different sort of D&D adventure: it played like d20 crossed with Chaosium's Call of Cthulhu (1981), complete with cultists, ancient gods, and even player handouts. The crossover was quite explicit, with cultists of Yig and the Yellow Sign being among series antagonists." The original adventure was soon followed by the rest of the trilogy over the next several months, Terror in Freeport (2000) and Madness in Freeport (2001).

Reception
Death in Freeport won the Origins Awards for "Best Roleplaying Adventure of 2000".

Death in Freeport won the 2001 ENnie Award for "Best Adventure".

Reviews
Pyramid
Polyhedron #147 (July, 2001)
Envoyer (German) (Issue 67 - May 2002)

References

D20 System adventures
ENnies winners
Fantasy campaign settings
Origins Award winners
Role-playing game supplements introduced in 2000